Hyosung GV250 is a 249 cc cruiser motorcycle manufactured by Hyosung Motors & Machinery Inc. The motorcycle's 2010 version produces .

The GV250 features the same electronic fuel injection (EFI) as the larger Hyosung GV650. Its 4-stroke, 4-valve, double overhead cam engine is air- and oil-cooled.

Notes

GV250
Mirage Premier
Cruiser motorcycles